Uwe Gasch (born 12 June 1961) is a retired German rower who won one silver and two bronze medals at the world championships of 1981–1985. He finished in fifth place in the coxless pair boat class at the 1988 Summer Olympics, rowing with Carl Ertel. His ex-wife, Marita Sandig, was also an Olympian rower.

References

1961 births
Living people
Sportspeople from Leipzig
People from Bezirk Leipzig
German male rowers
Olympic rowers of East Germany
Rowers at the 1988 Summer Olympics
World Rowing Championships medalists for East Germany